Chlorosarcina elegans is a species of green algae in the family Chlorosarcinaceae.

It is the type species of its genus. It is a terrestrial species.

References 

 Andreyeva, V.M (1998). Poczvennye i aerophilnye zelyonye vodorosli (Chlorophyta: Tetrasporales, Chlorococcales, Chlorosarcinales). Terrestrial and aerophilic green algae (Chlorophyta: Tetrasporales, Chlorococcales, Chlorosarcinales). page 349, 108 pls
 Khaybullina, L.S., Gaysina, L.A., Johansen, J.R. & Krautova, M. (2010). Examination of the terrestrial algae of the Great Smoky Mountains National Park, USA. Fottea, Olomouc 10, pages 201-215

Plants described in 1907
Chlamydomonadales